Mount Miller is a prominent mountain,  high, in the Holland Range of Antarctica, standing   south of Mount Lloyd. It was discovered and named by the British Antarctic Expedition, 1907–09.

References

Mountains of the Ross Dependency
Shackleton Coast
Four-thousanders of Antarctica